Jared Slingerland (born January 16, 1984) is a Canadian guitarist and electronic musician based in Vancouver, British Columbia. He is best known as a member of the electro-industrial band Front Line Assembly (FLA).

History

Early life
Slingerland was born in Kelowna, British Columbia, where his father (Glen Slingerland) was a local radio announcer on CKIQ. The family relocated to Calgary, Alberta shortly after his birth, when his father secured an on-air position at CHR radio station (AM106). During his childhood in Calgary, Slingerland attended his first music concert, featuring Canadian band Barenaked Ladies.

Music career
After eleven years in Calgary, the family relocated to Abbotsford, British Columbia. Slingerland began playing various instruments in his early teen years, ultimately excelling with the guitar. In his late teenage years, Slingerland formed a goth nu metal project, called Ms. Anne Thropy. Producer Jeremy Inkel later joined the project and the two worked together in his home studio. Shortly thereafter, Ms. Anne Thropy disbanded. Inkel and Slingerland continued to write music together for various projects (including a trip hop project).

In early 2004, Left Spine Down asked Slingerland to join the fold. In late 2005, he began working with Front Line Assembly in the studio and was eventually asked to tour with the band in support of the Artificial Soldier album. After leaving Left Spine Down in 2008, Slingerland continues to tour North America and Europe extensively as well as contributing writing/production for such albums as Improvised Electronic Device, AirMech, Echogenetic and more.

Discography

Albums
 Front Line Assembly - Artificial Soldier (2006, Metropolis)
 Front Line Assembly - Fallout (2007, Metropolis)
 Left Spine Down - Fighting for Voltage (2008, Synthetic Sounds)
 Front Line Assembly - Improvised Electronic Device (2010, Dependent Records / Metropolis)
 Delerium - Music Box Opera (2012, Nettwerk)
 Front Line Assembly - AirMech Soundtrack (2012, Valve / Steamworks)
 Front Line Assembly - Echogenetic (2013, Dependent Records / Metropolis)
 Phildel - The Glass Ghost (2014, Decca Records)
 Delerium - Rarities & B-Sides (2015, Nettwerk)
 Delerium - Mythologie (2016, Metropolis)

Remix releases
 Mindless Self Indulgence - Straight to Video: The Remixes (2006, Metropolis)

References

External links
Front Line Assembly Official Website
Front Line Assembly on Myspace
Front Line Assembly on Facebook

1984 births
Canadian electronic musicians
Canadian industrial musicians
21st-century Canadian multi-instrumentalists
Living people
Musicians from Vancouver
Musicians from Kelowna
Metropolis Records artists
21st-century Canadian guitarists
21st-century Canadian keyboardists
Canadian punk rock musicians
Front Line Assembly members
Left Spine Down members